Hans Hiltebrand (born 18 January 1945) is a Swiss bobsledder who competed from the late 1970s to the late 1980s. He won five medals at the FIBT World Championships with two golds (Two-man: 1977, Four-man: 1987) and three silvers (Two-man: 1982, 1987; Four-man: 1981.

Competing in three Winter Olympics, Hiltebrand earned his best finish of fourth in the two-man event at Lake Placid in 1980.

Following his retirement, he coached Canada's bobsleigh from 1989 to the 1998 Winter Olympics. Afterwards he became a well known bobsleigh designer.

Hiltebrand is still active in his bobsleigh club in Zurich as of 2007.

References

External links
1984 bobsleigh two-man results
1988 bobsleigh two-man results
1988 bobsleigh four-man results
Bobsleigh two-man world championship medalists since 1931
Bobsleigh four-man world championship medalists since 1930
Canoe.ca article featuring Hiltebrand for the 1998 Winter Olympics
History of bobsleigh in Canada featuring Hiltebrand
Schindler Metal Works of Houston, TX on president's work with Hiltebrand's bobsleighs
Wallechinsky, David (1984). "Bobsled". In The Complete Book of the Olympics: 1896 - 1980. New York: Penguin Books. pp. 559, 562.

Bobsledders at the 1980 Winter Olympics
Bobsledders at the 1984 Winter Olympics
Bobsledders at the 1988 Winter Olympics
Living people
Swiss male bobsledders
1945 births
Olympic bobsledders of Switzerland
20th-century Swiss people